Heritage Museum of Northwest Florida is a history museum in Valparaiso, Florida, Okaloosa County, Florida. The museum's permanent collection includes flint spear points, stone tools from Paleo-Archaic hunters, pottery shards from the Woodland Period, a black iron wash pot, crosscut saws, turpentine collection cups, a porcelain pitcher, lumber mill tokens, and old school desks. The museum's collection also covers the area's fishing history, includes a heritage mural, and hosts the Crestview Train Depot

The museum offers their Heritage Alive monthly classes on how to make like the local pioneers use to do in order to teach history in a hands on manner. These classes include the following:

References

External links
Heritage Museum of Northwest Florida website

Museums in Okaloosa County, Florida
History museums in Florida